Jean (John) de Bourbon, Duke of Bourbon (1426 – 1 April 1488), sometimes referred to as John the Good and The Scourge of the English, was a son of Charles I of Bourbon and Agnes of Burgundy. He was Duke of Bourbon and Auvergne from 1456 to his death.

Life

John earned his nicknames "John the Good" and "The Scourge of the English" for his efforts in helping drive out the English from France.

He was made constable of France in 1483 by his brother Peter and sister-in-law Anne, to neutralize him as a threat to their regency.

In an effort to win discontented nobles back to his side, Louis XI of France made great efforts to give out magnificent gifts to certain individuals; John was a recipient of these overtures. According to contemporary chronicles, the King received John in Paris with "honours, caresses, pardon, and gifts; everything was lavished upon him".

John is notable for making three brilliant alliances but leaving no legitimate issue.

First Marriage
In 1447, his father, the Duke of Bourbon, had John married to a daughter of Charles VII, King of France, Joan of Valois. They were duly married at the Château de Moulins. They had no surviving issue.

Second marriage
In 1484 at St. Cloud to Catherine of Armagnac, daughter of Jacques of Armagnac, Duke of Nemours, who died in 1487 while giving birth to:
 John of Bourbon (Moulins, 1487 - 1487), styled Count of Clermont

Third marriage
In 1487 he married Jeanne of Bourbon-Vendôme, daughter of John of Bourbon, Count of Vendôme (from a cadet branch of the House of Bourbon), by whom he had one son:
 Louis of Bourbon (1488 - 1488), styled Count of Clermont

Illegitimate issue
By Louise of Albret, daughter of Jean I d'Albret (- 8 September 1494): 
 Charles, Bastard of Bourbon (- 1502), Viscount of Lavedan jure uxoris, married before 1462 Louise du Lion (- aft. 25 February 1505), Viscountess of Lavedan, and had issue, four sons

By Marguerite de Brunant: 
 Mathieu, the Great Bastard of Bourbon (- Château de Chambrou-en-Forez, 19 August 1505), Lord of Botheon and Lord and Baron of Roche-en-Régnier, unmarried and without issue

By unknown women: 
 Hector, Bastard of Bourbon (- 1502, bur. Toulouse), 15th Archbishop of Toulouse (1491 - 1502), 17th Bishop of Lavaur (1497 - 1500)
 Peter, Bastard of Bourbon, died young, unmarried and without issue
 Marie, Bastard of Bourbon (- 22 July 1482), married at the Château de Beseneins-en-Dombes in 1470 Jacques de Sainte Colombe, Lord of Thil
 Marguerite, Bastard of Bourbon (1445 - 1482), legitimized in 1464, married in Moulins in 1462 Jean de Ferrières (- 1497)

Death and aftermath
John died in 1488 at the Château de Moulins and was succeeded by his younger brother Charles.  However, this succession was strongly contested due to the political strength of Peter and Anne.  Within a span of days, Charles was forced to renounce his claims to the Bourbon lands to Peter in exchange for a financial settlement.

Ancestry

Notes

References

Sources

House of Bourbon (France)
Dukes of Bourbon
Dukes of Auvergne
Constables of France
Counts of Clermont-en-Beauvaisis
Counts of Forez
Counts of Isle-Jourdain
1426 births
1488 deaths
Burials at Souvigny Priory
15th-century peers of France